Nationalist Party of Peru (in Spanish: Partido Nacionalista del Perú) was a political party in Peru.  It was founded in 1933 by Clemente Revilla. Later Víctor M. Arévalo became the party leader.

Political parties established in 1933
Defunct political parties in Peru